The almond (Prunus amygdalus, syn. Prunus dulcis) is a species of tree native to Iran and surrounding countries, including the Levant. The almond is also the name of the edible and widely cultivated seed of this tree. Within the genus Prunus, it is classified with the peach in the subgenus Amygdalus, distinguished from the other subgenera by corrugations on the shell (endocarp) surrounding the seed.

The fruit of the almond is a drupe, consisting of an outer hull and a hard shell with the seed, which is not a true nut. Shelling almonds refers to removing the shell to reveal the seed. Almonds are sold shelled or unshelled. Blanched almonds are shelled almonds that have been treated with hot water to soften the seedcoat, which is then removed to reveal the white embryo. Once almonds are cleaned and processed, they can be stored over time. Almonds are used in many food cuisines, often featuring prominently in desserts, such as marzipan. 

The almond tree prospers in a moderate Mediterranean climate with cool winter weather. California produces over half of the world's almond supply. Due to high acreage and water demand for almond cultivation, and need for pesticides, California almond production may be unsustainable, especially during the persistent drought and heat from climate change in the 21st century. Droughts in California have caused some producers to leave the industry, leading to lower supply and increased prices.

Description 

The young twigs are green at first, becoming purplish where exposed to sunlight, then gray in their second year.

The flowers are white to pale pink,  diameter with five petals, produced singly or in pairs and appearing before the leaves in early spring. Almond grows best in Mediterranean climates with warm, dry summers and mild, wet winters.

Almonds begin bearing an economic crop in the third year after planting. Trees reach full bearing five to six years after planting. The fruit matures in the autumn, 7–8 months after flowering.

It is not a nut but a drupe. The outer covering, consisting of an outer exocarp, or skin, and mesocarp, or flesh, fleshy in other members of Prunus such as the plum and cherry, is instead a thick, leathery, gray-green coat (with a downy exterior), called the hull. Inside the hull is a woody endocarp which forms a reticulated, hard shell (like the outside of a peach pit) called the pyrena. Inside the shell is the edible seed, commonly called a nut. Generally, one seed is present, but occasionally two occur. After the fruit matures, the hull splits and separates from the shell, and an abscission layer forms between the stem and the fruit so that the fruit can fall from the tree.

Taxonomy

Sweet and bitter almonds 

The seeds of Prunus dulcis var. dulcis are predominantly sweet but some individual trees produce seeds that are somewhat more bitter. The genetic basis for bitterness involves a single gene, the bitter flavor furthermore being recessive, both aspects making this trait easier to domesticate. The fruits from Prunus dulcis var. amara are always bitter, as are the kernels from other species of genus Prunus, such as apricot, peach and cherry (although to a lesser extent).

The bitter almond is slightly broader and shorter than the sweet almond and contains about 50% of the fixed oil that occurs in sweet almonds. It also contains the enzyme emulsin which, in the presence of water, acts on the two soluble glucosides amygdalin and prunasin yielding glucose, cyanide and the essential oil of bitter almonds, which is nearly pure benzaldehyde, the chemical causing the bitter flavor. Bitter almonds may yield 4–9 milligrams of hydrogen cyanide per almond and contain 42 times higher amounts of cyanide than the trace levels found in sweet almonds. The origin of cyanide content in bitter almonds is via the enzymatic hydrolysis of amygdalin. P450 monooxygenases are involved in the amygdalin biosynthetic pathway. A point mutation in a bHLH transcription factor prevents transcription of the two cytochrome P450 genes, resulting in the sweet kernel trait.

Etymology 

The word "almond" comes from Old French almande or alemande, Late Latin *amandula, *amindula, derived from amygdala from the Ancient Greek ἀμυγδάλη (amygdálē) (cf. amygdala, an almond-shaped portion of the brain). The al- in English, for the a- used in other languages may be due a confusion with the Arabic article al, the word having first dropped the a- as in the Italian form mandorla; the British pronunciation ah-mond and the modern Catalan ametlla and modern French amande show a form of the word closer to the original.

The adjective "amygdaloid" (literally "like an almond") is used to describe objects which are roughly almond-shaped, particularly a shape which is part way between a triangle and an ellipse. For example, the amygdala of the brain, which uses a direct borrowing of the Greek term amygdalē.

Distribution and habitat 

Almond is native to Southwestern Asia  and ancient remains of almonds were discovered in the Levant area. It was spread by humans in ancient times along the shores of the Mediterranean into northern Africa and southern Europe, and more recently transported to other parts of the world, notably California, United States. The wild form of domesticated almond grows in parts of the Levant.

Selection of the sweet type from the many bitter types in the wild marked the beginning of almond domestication. It is unclear as to which wild ancestor of the almond created the domesticated species. The species Prunus fenzliana may be the most likely wild ancestor of the almond, in part because it is native to Armenia and western Azerbaijan, where it was apparently domesticated. Wild almond species were grown by early farmers, "at first unintentionally in the garbage heaps, and later intentionally in their orchards".

Cultivation

Almonds were one of the earliest domesticated fruit trees, due to "the ability of the grower to raise attractive almonds from seed. Thus, in spite of the fact that this plant does not lend itself to propagation from suckers or from cuttings, it could have been domesticated even before the introduction of grafting". Domesticated almonds appear in the Early Bronze Age (3000–2000 BC), such as the archaeological sites of Numeira (Jordan), or possibly earlier. Another well-known archaeological example of the almond is the fruit found in Tutankhamun's tomb in Egypt (c. 1325 BC), probably imported from the Levant. An article on almond tree cultivation in Spain is brought down in Ibn al-'Awwam's 12th-century agricultural work, Book on Agriculture.

Of the European countries that the Royal Botanic Garden Edinburgh reported as cultivating almonds, Germany is the northernmost, though the domesticated form can be found as far north as Iceland.

Varieties
Almond trees are small to medium sized but commercial cultivars can be grafted onto a different root-stock to produce smaller trees. Varieties include:
 Nonpareil – originates in the 1800s. A large tree that produces large, smooth, thin-shelled almonds with 60–65% edible kernel per nut. Requires pollination from other almond varieties for good nut production.
 Tuono – originates in Italy. Has thicker, hairier shells with only 32% of edible kernel per nut. The thicker shell gives some protection from pests such as the navel orangeworm. Does not require pollination by other almond varieties.
 Mariana – used as a rootstock to result in smaller trees

Breeding
Breeding programmes have found the high shell-seal trait.

Pollination 
The most widely planted varieties of almond are self-incompatible; hence these trees require pollen from a tree with different genetic characters to produce seeds. Almond orchards therefore must grow mixtures of almond varieties. In addition, the pollen is transferred from flower to flower by insects; therefore commercial growers must ensure there are enough insects to perform this task. The large scale of almond production in the U.S. creates a significant problem of providing enough pollinating insects. Additional pollinating insects are therefore brought to the trees. The pollination of California's almonds is the largest annual managed pollination event in the world, with 1.4 million hives (nearly half of all beehives in the US) being brought to the almond orchards each February.

Much of the supply of bees is managed by pollination brokers, who contract with migratory beekeepers from at least 49 states for the event. This business was heavily affected by colony collapse disorder at the turn of the 21st century, causing a nationwide shortage of honey bees and increasing the price of insect pollination. To partially protect almond growers from these costs, researchers at the USA government Agricultural Research Service have developed self-pollinating almond trees that combine this character with quality characters such as a flavor and yield. Self-pollinating almond varieties exist, but they lack some commercial characters. However, through natural hybridisation between different almond varieties, a new variety that was self-pollinating with a high yield of commercial quality nuts was produced.

Diseases 

Almond trees can be attacked by an array of damaging microbes, fungal pathogens, plant viruses, and bacteria.

Pests 
Pavement ants (Tetramorium caespitum), southern fire ants (Solenopsis xyloni), and thief ants (Solenopsis molesta) are seed predators. Bryobia rubrioculus mites are most known for their damage to this crop.

Sustainability 
Almond production in California is concentrated mainly in the Central Valley, where the mild climate, rich soil, abundant sunshine and water supply make for ideal growing conditions. Due to the persistent droughts in California in the early 21st century, it became more difficult to raise almonds in a sustainable manner. Regulations related to water supplies are changing so some growers have destroyed their current almond orchards to replace with either younger trees or a different crop such as pistachio that needs less water.

Sustainability strategies implemented by the Almond Board of California and almond farmers include:
 tree and soil health, and other farming practices
 minimizing dust production during the harvest
 bee health
 irrigation guidelines for farmers
 food safety
 use of waste biomass as coproducts with a goal to achieve zero waste
 use of solar energy during processing
 job development
 support of scientific research to investigate potential health benefits of consuming almonds
 international education about sustainability practices

Production 

In 2020, world production of almonds was 4.1 million tonnes, led by the United States providing 57% of the world total (table). Other leading producers were Spain, Australia, and Iran.

United States 
California production is marked by a period of intense pollination during late winter by rented commercial bees transported by truck across the U.S. to almond groves, requiring more than half of the total U.S. commercial honeybee population. The value of total U.S. exports of shelled almonds in 2016 was $3.2 billion.

All commercially grown almonds sold as food in the U.S. are sweet cultivars. The U.S. Food and Drug Administration reported in 2010 that some fractions of imported sweet almonds were contaminated with bitter almonds, which contain cyanide.

Spain 
Spain has diverse commercial cultivars of almonds grown in Catalonia, Valencia, Murcia, Andalusia, and Aragón regions, and the Balearic Islands. Production in 2016 declined 2% nationally compared to 2015 production data.

The 'Marcona' almond cultivar is recognizably different from other almonds and is marketed by name. The kernel is short, round, relatively sweet, and delicate in texture. Its origin is unknown and has been grown in Spain for a long time; the tree is very productive, and the shell of the nut is very hard.

Australia 
Australia is the largest almond production region in the Southern Hemisphere. Most of the almond orchards are located along the Murray River corridor in New South Wales, Victoria, and South Australia.

Toxicity 

Bitter almonds contain 42 times higher amounts of cyanide than the trace levels found in sweet almonds. Extract of bitter almond was once used medicinally but even in small doses, effects are severe or lethal, especially in children; the cyanide must be removed before consumption. The acute oral lethal dose of cyanide for adult humans is reported to be  of body weight (approximately 50 bitter almonds), so that for children consuming 5–10 bitter almonds may be fatal. Symptoms of eating such almonds include vertigo and other typical cyanide poisoning effects.

Almonds may cause allergy or intolerance. Cross-reactivity is common with peach allergens (lipid transfer proteins) and tree nut allergens. Symptoms range from local signs and symptoms (e.g., oral allergy syndrome, contact urticaria) to systemic signs and symptoms including anaphylaxis (e.g., urticaria, angioedema, gastrointestinal and respiratory symptoms).

Almonds are susceptible to aflatoxin-producing molds. Aflatoxins are potent carcinogenic chemicals produced by molds such as Aspergillus flavus and Aspergillus parasiticus. The mold contamination may occur from soil, previously infested almonds, and almond pests such as navel-orange worm. High levels of mold growth typically appear as gray to black filament-like growth. It is unsafe to eat mold-infected tree nuts.

Some countries have strict limits on allowable levels of aflatoxin contamination of almonds and require adequate testing before the nuts can be marketed to their citizens. The European Union, for example, introduced a requirement since 2007 that all almond shipments to the EU be tested for aflatoxin. If aflatoxin does not meet the strict safety regulations, the entire consignment may be reprocessed to eliminate the aflatoxin or it must be destroyed.

Breeding programs have found the  trait. High shell-seal provides resistance against these Aspergillus species and so against the development of their toxins.

Mandatory pasteurization in California 

After tracing cases of salmonellosis to almonds, the USDA approved a proposal by the Almond Board of California to pasteurize almonds sold to the public. After publishing the rule in March 2007, the almond pasteurization program became mandatory for California companies effective 1 September 2007. Raw, untreated California almonds have not been available in the U.S. since then.

California almonds labeled "raw" must be steam-pasteurized or chemically treated with propylene oxide (PPO). This does not apply to imported almonds or almonds sold from the grower directly to the consumer in small quantities. The treatment also is not required for raw almonds sold for export outside of North America.

The Almond Board of California states: "PPO residue dissipates after treatment". The U.S. Environmental Protection Agency has reported: "Propylene oxide has been detected in fumigated food products; consumption of contaminated food is another possible route of exposure". PPO is classified as Group 2B ("possibly carcinogenic to humans").

The USDA-approved marketing order was challenged in court by organic farmers organized by the Cornucopia Institute, a Wisconsin-based farm policy research group which filed a lawsuit in September 2008. According to the institute, this almond marketing order has imposed significant financial burdens on small-scale and organic growers and damaged domestic almond markets. A federal judge dismissed the lawsuit in early 2009 on procedural grounds. In August 2010, a federal appeals court ruled that the farmers have a right to appeal the USDA regulation. In March 2013, the court vacated the suit on the basis that the objections should have been raised in 2007 when the regulation was first proposed.

Uses

Nutrition 

Almonds are 4% water, 22% carbohydrates, 21% protein, and 50% fat (table). In a  reference amount, almonds supply  of food energy. The almond is a nutritionally dense food (table), providing a rich source (20% or more of the Daily Value, DV) of the B vitamins riboflavin and niacin, vitamin E, and the essential minerals calcium, copper, iron, magnesium, manganese, phosphorus, and zinc. Almonds are a moderate source (10–19% DV) of the B vitamins thiamine, vitamin B6, and folate, choline, and the essential mineral potassium. They also contain substantial dietary fiber, the monounsaturated fat, oleic acid, and the polyunsaturated fat, linoleic acid. Typical of nuts and seeds, almonds are a source of phytosterols such as beta-sitosterol, stigmasterol, campesterol, sitostanol, and campestanol.

Health
Almonds are included as a good source of protein among recommended healthy foods by the U.S. Department of Agriculture (USDA). A 2016 review of clinical research indicated that regular consumption of almonds may reduce the risk of heart disease by lowering blood levels of LDL cholesterol.

Culinary 

While the almond is often eaten on its own, raw or toasted, it is also a component of various dishes. Almonds are available in many forms, such as whole, slivered, and ground into flour.

Almonds are a common addition to breakfast muesli or oatmeal.

Desserts

A wide range of classic sweets feature almonds as a central ingredient. Marzipan was developed in the Middle Ages. Since the 19th century almonds have been used to make bread, almond butter, cakes and puddings, candied confections, almond cream-filled pastries, nougat, cookies (macaroons, biscotti and qurabiya), and cakes (financiers, Esterházy torte), and other sweets and desserts.

The young, developing fruit of the almond tree can be eaten whole (green almonds) when they are still green and fleshy on the outside and the inner shell has not yet hardened. The fruit is somewhat sour, but is a popular snack in parts of the Middle East, eaten dipped in salt to balance the sour taste. Also in the Middle East they are often eaten with dates. They are available only from mid-April to mid-June in the Northern Hemisphere; pickling or brining extends the fruit's shelf life.

Marzipan

Marzipan, a smooth, sweetened almond paste, is used in a number of elegant cakes and desserts. Princess cake is covered by marzipan (similar to fondant), as is Battenberg cake. In Sicily, sponge cake is covered with marzipan to make cassatella di sant'Agata and cassata siciliana, and marzipan is dyed and crafted into realistic fruit shaped to make frutta martorana. The Andalusian Christmas pastry pan de Cádiz is filled with marzipan and candied fruit.

World cuisines

In French cuisine, alternating layers of almond and hazelnut meringue are used to make the dessert dacquoise. Pithivier is one of many almond cream-filled pastries.
In Germany, Easter bread called Deutsches Osterbrot is baked with raisins and almonds.
In Greece almond flour is used to make amygdalopita, a glyka tapsiou dessert cake baking in a tray. Almonds are used for kourabiedes, a Greek version of the traditional quarabiya almond biscuits. A soft drink known as soumada is made from almonds in various regions.
In Saudi Arabia, almonds are a typical embellishment for the rice dish kabsa.
In Iran, green almonds are dipped in sea salt and eaten as snacks on street markets; they are called chaqale bâdam. Candied almonds called noghl are served alongside tea and coffee. Also, sweet almonds are used to prepare special food for babies, named harire badam. Almonds are added to some foods, cookies, and desserts, or are used to decorate foods. People in Iran consume roasted nuts for special events, for example, during New Year (Nowruz) parties.
In Italy, colomba di Pasqua is a traditional Easter cake made with almonds. Bitter almonds are the base for amaretti cookies, a common dessert. Almonds are also a common choice as the nuts to include in torrone.
In Morocco, almonds in the form of sweet almond paste are the main ingredient in pastry fillings, and several other desserts. Fried blanched whole almonds are also used to decorate sweet tajines such as lamb with prunes. Southwestern Berber regions of Essaouira and Souss are also known for amlou, a spread made of almond paste, argan oil, and honey. Almond paste is also mixed with toasted flour and among others, honey, olive oil or butter, anise, fennel, sesame seeds, and cinnamon to make sellou (also called zamita in Meknes or slilou in Marrakech), a sweet snack known for its long shelf life and high nutritive value.
In Indian cuisine, almonds are the base ingredients of pasanda-style and Mughlai curries. Badam halva is a sweet made from almonds with added coloring. Almond flakes are added to many sweets (such as sohan barfi), and are usually visible sticking to the outer surface. Almonds form the base of various drinks which are supposed to have cooling properties. Almond sherbet or sherbet-e-badaam, is a popular summer drink. Almonds are also sold as a snack with added salt.
In Israel almonds are used as a topping for tahini cookies or eaten as a snack.
In Spain Marcona almonds are usually toasted in oil and lightly salted. They are used by Spanish confectioners to prepare a sweet called turrón.
In Arabian cuisine, almonds are commonly used as garnishing for Mansaf.
Certain natural food stores sell "bitter almonds" or "apricot kernels" labeled as such, requiring significant caution by consumers for how to prepare and eat these products.

Milk 

Almonds can be processed into a milk substitute called almond milk; the nut's soft texture, mild flavor, and light coloring (when skinned) make for an efficient analog to dairy, and a soy-free choice for lactose intolerant people and vegans. Raw, blanched, and lightly toasted almonds work well for different production techniques, some of which are similar to that of soymilk and some of which use no heat, resulting in raw milk.

Almond milk, along with almond butter and almond oil, are a versatile products used in both sweet and savoury dishes.

In Moroccan cuisine, sharbat billooz is one of the best known beverages, served for weddings, it is made by blending blanched almonds with milk, sugar and other flavorings.

Flour and skins 

Almond flour or ground almond meal combined with sugar or honey as marzipan is often used as a gluten-free alternative to wheat flour in cooking and baking.

Almonds contain polyphenols in their skins consisting of flavonols, flavan-3-ols, hydroxybenzoic acids and flavanones analogous to those of certain fruits and vegetables. These phenolic compounds and almond skin prebiotic dietary fiber have commercial interest as food additives or dietary supplements.

Syrup 
Historically, almond syrup was an emulsion of sweet and bitter almonds, usually made with barley syrup (orgeat syrup) or in a syrup of orange flower water and sugar, often flavored with a synthetic aroma of almonds. Orgeat syrup is an important ingredient in the Mai Tai and many other Tiki drinks.

Due to the cyanide found in bitter almonds, modern syrups generally are produced only from sweet almonds. Such syrup products do not contain significant levels of hydrocyanic acid, so are generally considered safe for human consumption.

Oils 

Almonds are a rich source of oil, with 50% of kernel dry mass as fat (whole almond nutrition table). In relation to total dry mass of the kernel, almond oil contains 32% monounsaturated oleic acid (an omega-9 fatty acid), 13% linoleic acid (a polyunsaturated omega-6 essential fatty acid), and 10% saturated fatty acid (mainly as palmitic acid). Linolenic acid, a polyunsaturated omega-3 fat, is not present (table). Almond oil is a rich source of vitamin E, providing 261% of the Daily Value per 100 millilitres.

When almond oil is analyzed separately and expressed per 100 grams as a reference mass, the oil provides  of food energy, 8 grams of saturated fat (81% of which is palmitic acid), 70 grams of oleic acid, and 17 grams of linoleic acid (oil table).

Oleum amygdalae, the fixed oil, is prepared from either sweet or bitter almonds, and is a glyceryl oleate with a slight odour and a nutty taste. It is almost insoluble in alcohol but readily soluble in chloroform or ether. Almond oil is obtained from the dried kernel of almonds. Sweet almond oil is used as a carrier oil in aromatherapy and cosmetics while bitter almond oil, containing benzaldehyde, is used as a food flavouring and in perfume.

In culture 
The almond is highly revered in some cultures. The tree originated in the Middle East. In the Bible the almond is mentioned ten times, beginning with Genesis 43:11, where it is described as "among the best of fruits". In Numbers 17 Levi is chosen from the other tribes of Israel by Aaron's rod, which brought forth almond flowers. The almond blossom supplied a model for the menorah which stood in the Holy Temple, "Three cups, shaped like almond blossoms, were on one branch, with a knob and a flower; and three cups, shaped like almond blossoms, were on the other...on the candlestick itself were four cups, shaped like almond blossoms, with its knobs and flowers"  (Exodus 25:33–34; 37:19–20). Many Sephardic Jews give five almonds to each guest before special occasions like weddings.

Similarly, Christian symbolism often uses almond branches as a symbol of the virgin birth of Jesus; paintings and icons often include almond-shaped haloes encircling the Christ Child and as a symbol of Mary. The word "Luz", which appears in Genesis 30:37, sometimes translated as "hazel", may actually be derived from the Aramaic name for almond (Luz), and is translated as such in the New International Version and other versions of the Bible. The Arabic name for almond is لوز "lauz" or "lūz". In some parts of the Levant and North Africa it is pronounced "loz", which is very close to its Aramaic origin.

The Entrance of the flower (La entrada de la flor) is an event celebrated on 1 February in Torrent, Spain, in which the clavarios and members of the Confrerie of the Mother of God deliver a branch of the first-blooming almond-tree to the Virgin.

See also 

 Fruit tree forms
 Fruit tree propagation
 Fruit tree pruning
 List of almond dishes
 List of edible seeds

References

External links 

 
 
 University of California Fruit and Nut Research and Information Center 
 Benefits of Soaked Almonds

 
Almond
Edible nuts and seeds
Flora of Asia
Pollination management
Snack foods
Almond oil
Crops
Fruit trees
Symbols of California
Flora of Lebanon and Syria